Jovana Damnjanović (Serbian Cyrillic: Јована Дамњановић; born 24 November 1994) is a Serbian footballer who plays as a forward for Bayern Munich in the German Frauen-Bundesliga.

Career
Among the teams she played for were ŽFK Crvena zvezda and VfL Wolfsburg. She is a member of the Serbia women's national football team. The footballer Jelena Čanković is Damnjanović's first cousin. With VfL Wolfsburg she won 2013–14 UEFA Women's Champions League and became the first Serbian female player to achieve this feat.

International goals

Honors
Wolfsburg
UEFA Women's Champions League: 2013/14
 Bundesliga: Winner 2013–14
 DFB-Pokal: Winner 2014–15

Bayern Munich
Bundesliga: 2020-21

References

External links
 

1994 births
Living people
Serbian women's footballers
Serbian expatriate sportspeople in Germany
Serbia women's international footballers
VfL Wolfsburg (women) players
SC Sand players
Expatriate women's footballers in Germany
Frauen-Bundesliga players
FC Bayern Munich (women) players
Footballers from Belgrade
Women's association football forwards
ŽFK Crvena zvezda players